IIona Zádor was a female Hungarian international table tennis player.

Table tennis career
She won a bronze medal at the 1929 World Table Tennis Championships in the women's doubles with Magda Gál.

Personal life
She was of Jewish descent.

See also
 List of table tennis players
 List of World Table Tennis Championships medalists

References

Hungarian female table tennis players
World Table Tennis Championships medalists